Anton Foek (born Paramaribo, Suriname 3 September 1941) Anton JieSamFoek, is a Dutch radio and television producer, and freelance journalist.

Life 
Anton JieSamFoek is of Surinamese origin with Chinese, African, Portuguese-Jewish and German/Dutch ancestors. 
In 1954 he migrated to the Netherlands attending High Schools in Utrecht and Hilversum. He studied International law at the University of Amsterdam after attending the Sorbonne in Paris where he studied European culture and International relations.
He started working as a foreign correspondent for the Dutch media [ AVRO, NOSR/TV ] in 1969 and was almost immediately transferred to South America and based in Rio de Janeiro, Brazil. He was trained by the then Washington Bureau chief of the Dutch TV station AVRO.

In 1971 he was transferred to Santiago de Chile to report on the Allende years only to be kidnapped, tortured and imprisoned in Sept 1973. Upon his release he was kicked out of Chile by the Pinochet regime.
During his time as a reporter and foreign correspondent he was imprisoned several times. Twice in Chile, but also in Mexico, Southern Sudan and Bolivia.

In the late 80's early 90's he started his successful TV and video company Columbus Cine in Rio de Janeiro, Brasil and Miami, Fl. producing a weekly TV show Brasil/2000 aired on SPN a cable network run by Ed Taylor and later sold to CNN. At the same time he also started eyesonbrasil.com. 
In 2007 he bought 40% of Hollywood Stars II, a weekly TV show owned by his long time friend and one of the great American reporters, Sam Summerlin, but was not able to resurrect the ailing company. In 2013 Anton designed and build eyesonsuriname.com for the then Governor of the Central Bank later Minister of Finance in Suriname.

He currently lives in Nice, Southern France and Amsterdam, Holland.

He reports, among others, for CorpWatch, and The Washington Times, BBC, RNW BBC
Human, VPRO, the new combination of Dutch Radio Stations NPS, Teleac and RVU NTR NPS Trouw, TheHumanist TheHumanist

In 1982, he started his own television production company Columbus Cine Ltda in Brazil. He produced a one-hour-a-week program aired on the Satellite Program Network in Tulsa Oklahoma. owned by Ed Taylor and Ted Turner.

He travelled the world having visited over 126 countries producing radio and TV programs often with human rights and other humanitarian themes. Several Dutch and international newspapers have printed his stories, including prx, and de Ware Tijd, a leading newspaper from Suriname. In 1997 he won the prestigious Project Censored award from the Sonoma University in California. He has invested in a television production company Hollywood Stars II owned by Sam Summerlin of New York.

Family 
He married in 1980 in Houston, Texas. Two children were born in Rio de Janeiro, Brazil in May 1986 and Feb 1989.
In 1990, he returned to Europe only to be divorced by his wife. He then continued his reporting life based in New York. 
He now spends his time between Amsterdam, and lives in Nice, France, his other home.

See also
List of kidnappings

References

External links 
Journalist's website

1941 births
1970s missing person cases
Dutch journalists
Dutch people of Chinese descent
Dutch television producers
Formerly missing people
Kidnapped Dutch people
Living people
Missing person cases in Chile
People from Paramaribo
Surinamese emigrants to the Netherlands
Surinamese people of Chinese descent
Surinamese people of Dutch descent
Surinamese people of Portuguese descent
University of Amsterdam alumni